The 1989 Tulsa Golden Hurricane football team represented the University of Tulsa as an independent during the 1989 NCAA Division I-A football season. In their second year under head coach David Rader, the Golden Hurricane compiled a 6–6 record. Tulsa was invited to the Independence Bowl, where the Golden Hurricane lost to Oregon. The team's statistical leaders included quarterback T. J. Rubley with 2,292 passing yards, Brett Adams with 1,071 rushing yards, and Dan Bitson with 1,425 receiving yards.

Schedule

Roster

References

Tulsa
Tulsa Golden Hurricane football seasons
Tulsa Golden Hurricane football